For You is the debut studio album by American singer-songwriter Prince. It was released by Warner Bros. Records on April 7, 1978. All tracks were produced, arranged, composed, and performed by Prince. Prince started recording in September 1977 at Sound 80 in Minneapolis, Minnesota, where he had previously made a demo. Friend and producer David Rivkin (later known as David Z) provided advice and engineering assistance.

For You reached No. 163 on the Billboard 200 and No. 21 on the Billboard Soul chart. "Soft and Wet", the album's lead single, became a minor hit on the Billboard Hot 100, peaking at No. 92. However, it became a Top 20 hit on the Billboard Hot Soul Singles chart, peaking at No. 12. In 2016, after Prince's death, the album re-charted on the Billboard 200, reaching No. 138.

Production
Prince started recording in September 1977 at Sound 80 in Minneapolis, Minnesota, where he had previously made a demo. Friend and producer David Rivkin (later known as David Z) provided advice and engineering assistance. Rivkin was being considered for the role of executive producer, but Warner Bros. instead chose Tommy Vicari, known for his work with Gino Vannelli. Vicari suggested taking the project to a studio in Los Angeles, but Prince's manager Owen Husney chose the Record Plant in Sausalito, California. Shifting the project to California, Prince, Vicari, Husney, and Husney's wife settled into an apartment in Mill Valley, California, with a view looking down at Sausalito and out to the San Francisco Bay.

Starting in October, the basic tracks were recorded over three months at the Record Plant. Vicari tried to exert his influence as producer but Prince shrugged off any advice that was contrary to his wishes. Prince worked obsessively on the project, singing all vocals and playing all instruments, including acoustic, electric, and bass guitar; acoustic and Fender Rhodes piano; synth bass; various keyboard synths by Oberheim, Moog, and Arp; orchestra bells; drums and percussion. He used the Oberheim to provide the sound of a horn section, but with guitar lines layered into the mix. The basic tracks were finished in late December 1977. Husney later observed that Prince had drained Vicari during the recording process, such that Vicari was "heartbroken" because he had just been "treated like shit".

In January 1978, Prince and Vicari moved the project to engineer Armin Steiner's Sound Labs studio in Hollywood to begin overdubs and final mixing. Prince distanced himself further from Vicari, concentrating on laying down multiple vocal lines to create a polished commercial sound. Warner Bros. selected an art director to design the album cover but Prince booked his own photography session with Joe Gianetti, resulting in a head shot taken in a dark room with Prince's face lit by candlelight. Prince completed the final mixes on February 28. The total project cost $170,500—US$ in  dollars—three times the original budget. With all the work, including 46 vocal lines layered into the first track, Prince was exhausted. He later said that he was a "physical wreck" when he finished.

Singles
"Soft and Wet", the album's lead single, became a minor hit on the US Billboard Hot 100, peaking at number 92. However, it became a top 20 hit on the Hot R&B/Hip-Hop Songs chart, peaking at number 12. The second single released from the album, "Just as Long as We're Together", reached number 91 on the R&B charts.

Critical reception

Reviewing in Christgau's Record Guide: Rock Albums of the Seventies (1981), Robert Christgau wrote, "Like most in-studio one-man bands, the nineteen-year-old kid who pieced this disco-rock-pop-funk concoction together has a weakness for the programmatic—lots of chops, not much challenge. But I like 'Baby,' about making one, and 'Soft and Wet,' ditto only he doesn't know it yet. And his falsetto beats Emitt Rhodes."

Commercial performance
On release in 1978, For You reached number 163 on the US Billboard 200 chart and number 21 on the Billboard R&B Albums chart. It went on to sell approximately two million copies worldwide. In 2016, after Prince's death, the album re-charted on the Billboard 200, reaching number 138. The album also reached number 200 on the French Albums Chart and number 156 on the UK Albums Chart, although it did not originally chart in those countries.

Track listing

Personnel
Information taken from the Prince Vault website.
 Prince – lead vocals, backing vocals, all instrumentation, producer, arranger, engineer, dust cover design
Technical
 Tommy Vicari – executive producer, engineer, remixer
 David Rivkin – vocal recording engineer (uncredited)
 Patrice Rushen – synth programming (uncredited)
 Charles Veal – string arrangement on Baby (uncredited)
 Steve Fontano – assistant engineer
 Dave Roeder – assistant engineer
 Bernie Grundman – mastering (A&M)
 Jeff Farmakes – art direction (The Ad Company)
 Joe Giannetti – photography

Charts

References

External links
For You at Discogs

1978 debut albums
Prince (musician) albums
Albums produced by Prince (musician)
Albums recorded at Record Plant (New York City)
Warner Records albums